The 2015 ATP Challenger 2001 Team Padova was a professional tennis tournament played on clay courts. It was the second edition of the tournament which was part of the 2015 ATP Challenger Tour. It took place in Padova, Italy between 29 June and 5 July 2013.

Singles main-draw entrants

Seeds

 1 Rankings are as of June 22, 2015.

Other entrants
The following players received wildcards into the singles main draw:
  Omar Giacalone
  Lee Duck-hee
  Stefano Napolitano
  Stefano Travaglia

The following players received entry from the qualifying draw:
  Erik Crepaldi
  Hugo Dellien
  Federico Gaio
  Alessandro Giannessi

The following players used the protected ranking to gain entry into the main draw:
  Pedro Sousa

The following players was given Special Exempt to gain entry into the main draw:
  Calvin Hemery

The following players was given alternate to gain entry into the main draw:
  Riccardo Bellotti

Doubles main-draw entrants

Seeds

1 Rankings as of June 22, 2015.

Other entrants
The following pairs received wildcards into the doubles main draw:
  Marco Bergagnin /  Michele Longo
  Federico Gaio /  Alessandro Giannessi
  Omar Giacalone /  Stefano Napolitano

The following pairs gained entry into the doubles main draw as an alternate:
  Marco Bortolotti /  Alexandros Jakupovic

Champions

Singles

  Andrej Martin def.  Albert Montañés, 0–6, 6–4, 7–6(8–6)

Doubles

 Michail Elgin /  Andrey Rublev def.  Federico Gaio /  Alessandro Giannessi, 6–4, 7–6(7–4)

External links
[ Official Website]

2015 ATP Challenger Tour